Baba Shamalek (also Romanized as Bābā Shamalek) is a village in Maraveh Tappeh Rural District, in the Central District of Maraveh Tappeh County, Golestan Province, Iran. At the 2006 census, its population was 325, in 59 families.

References 

Populated places in Maraveh Tappeh County